Aaron Mitchell (born Aug 25, 1969) is a middleweight boxer from Vero Beach, Florida. He was the WBO NABO middleweight champion.

References

External links 
 

Boxers from Florida
1969 births
Living people
American male boxers
Middleweight boxers